Mary Virginia Harvey (born June 4, 1965) is an American retired soccer goalkeeper.  She was the starting goalie for 1991 U.S. Women's National Team which won the inaugural 1991 FIFA Women's World Cup; and a member of the 1996 Olympic Gold Medal team.  Harvey retired from international competition in 1996 following the Atlanta Olympics.

Early life

Berkeley
Harvey earned her undergraduate degree from the University of California at Berkeley and her MBA from UCLA's Anderson School of Management.

Playing career
After graduating, Harvey played semi-professional soccer in Europe. She represented FSV Frankfurt of Germany between 1988 and 1991, as well as Hammarby IF and Tyresö FF of Sweden in 1993 and 1994 respectively.

After making her debut against Poland in 1989, Harvey won 27 caps for the United States women's national soccer team. Her last appearance came in 1996 against Australia.

Sports administration career
Off the field, Harvey served on U.S. Soccer's board of directors for 12 years, including 5 years on the Executive Committee; and on the U.S. Olympic Committee. In 2003, Harvey was hired by FIFA to become its Director of Development, becoming the first woman and first American hired by the international governing body to run a division. In this role, Harvey was responsible for managing the US$160 million per year development budget for FIFA, including such programs as the Financial Assistance Program, the Goal Programme, and FIFA's education or course programs.  She was also responsible for FIFA's activities to develop women's football, futsal and beach soccer, and to oversee FIFA's sports medicine activities.  Mary was involved in the reform process at FIFA and launched the #WomeninFIFA campaign with Australian Moya Dodd.  The campaign was successful in achieving gender inclusion as a core tenet of the reforms passed in 2016. Prior to joining FIFA, Harvey was the CEO of a US$15 million sports and fitness company, and worked in the management consulting industry for both Deloitte. and Accenture.

In 2008, Harvey left FIFA to return to her native United States to become the chief operating officer for Women's Professional Soccer, the new women's professional soccer league in the United States. Harvey left WPS in 2010 after two seasons.

In 2017, Harvey joined the bid team to bring the 2026 FIFA World Cup to North America. Harvey was responsible for writing the United 2026 Human Rights Strategy, the first of its kind for a mega-sporting-event. The 2026 FIFA World Cup was awarded to Canada, Mexico and the United States at the 2018 FIFA Congress in Moscow.

Mary has served as a sport envoy for the US State Department’s Sports Diplomacy Division on several occasions, including missions to Iraq, Jordan, Canada and Mexico. Mary also serves as the Vice Chair of the Board of Directors of the Green Sports Alliance, an organisation dedicated to leveraging the cultural and market influence of sports to inspire sports leagues, teams, venues, their partners and millions of fans to embrace renewable energy, healthy food, recycling, water efficiency, species preservation, safer chemicals and other environmentally preferable practices.

She is currently the chief executive of the Centre for Sport and Human Rights – a human rights organisation for the world of sport.

Honors and awards
Harvey's honors include:
US Soccer Werner Fricker Award (2016);
Hall of Fame, United States Olympic Committee (1996 Olympic Team);
Medal of Honor, U.S. Soccer Hall of Fame (1991 Women's World Cup Team);
 National Goalkeeper of the year (1986);
Hall of Fame, Cal Athletics (2000);
Hall of Fame, American Youth Soccer Organization (2003)

See also
 1991 U.S. Women's National Team roster

References

External links
 
 Cal Bears player profile

1965 births
Living people
Olympic gold medalists for the United States in soccer
California Golden Bears women's soccer players
United States women's international soccer players
Expatriate women's footballers in Germany
FSV Frankfurt (women) players
1991 FIFA Women's World Cup players
1995 FIFA Women's World Cup players
Damallsvenskan players
Hammarby Fotboll (women) players
Tyresö FF players
FIFA Women's World Cup-winning players
American women's soccer players
Women's association football goalkeepers
Medalists at the 1996 Summer Olympics
Footballers at the 1996 Summer Olympics